Cullerin was a small railway station on the Main South railway line in Cullerin, New South Wales, Australia. It opened in 1875, and was located near the top of the Cullerin Range. It closed to passenger services in 1974. It was later completely demolished and no trace of the station now survives. Legal names of the area were no longer recorded as of 1976.

References

Disused regional railway stations in New South Wales
Railway stations in Australia opened in 1875
Railway stations closed in 1974
Main Southern railway line, New South Wales